Hamad may refer to:

People
Hamad (name), an Arabic given name and surname
Hamad ibn Isa Al Khalifa (1872–1942), Ruler of Bahrain from 1932 until his death in 1942.
Hamad bin Isa Al Khalifa, King of Bahrain since 2002.

Cities and villages
Hamad Town, also known as Madinat Hamad, a city in northern Bahrain
Abu Hamad, also spelt Abu Hamed, a town of Sudan

Other locations
Hamad International Airport, the international airport facility in Doha, Qatar.
 Hamad Port, Qatar's main seaport, located south of Doha.
Hamad Bin Khalifa University (HBKU), a research university, in Education City, Qatar.
Hamad Aquatic Centre, large swimming pool complex in Doha, Qatar.
Hamad bin Khalifa Stadium, also known as Al Ahli SC Stadium, a football stadium in Doha, Qatar.
Grand Hamad Stadium, also known as the Al-Arabi Sports Club stadium, multi-purpose stadium in Doha, Qatar.
Jassim bin Hamad Stadium also known as al-Sadd Stadium), multi-purpose stadium in Doha, Qatar.
Suheim bin Hamad Stadium also known as Qatar SC Stadium, is a multi-purpose stadium in Doha, Qatar.
Mohammed Al-Hamad Stadium, a multi-purpose stadium in Hawally, Kuwait
Hamad a desert in the Middle East
Al Futaisi, an island in Abu Dhabi. Prior to 2013 the island had a 1,700-meter waterway. in the shape of the name  "Hamad"

Various
Hamad Medical Corporation Qatar's premier non-profit health care provider

See also
 Al Hamed, a town in Egypt near Rosetta